Alan Warner (born 1964) is a Scottish novelist who grew up in Connel, near Oban. His notable novels include Morvern Callar and The Sopranos – the latter being the inspiration for the play Our Ladies of Perpetual Succour and its subsequent film adaptation, Our Ladies.

Life and career

Early life
Warner's father was a Yorkshireman who served in World War Two. His parents were in their forties when he was born, and ran a coal delivery business in Mull, a shop in Kilchoan, and a small hotel in Oban, before in 1963 buying the 42-bedroom Marine Hotel, close to Oban ferry terminal.

He attended Oban High School, and his interest in reading was sparked when he was fifteen, after he bought three novels whose covers suggested stories with a sexual dimension: Charles Webb's The Graduate, André Gide's The Immoralist and Albert Camus' The Outsider. He explained in an interview with the Scottish Review of Books in 2011: "I had presumed novels were an art form which only happened elsewhere and had died out in Scotland around the time of Walter Scott. What a very curious but genuine assumption. On the other hand, I could argue this was because local bookshops were stuffed with Scott and not a single work of modern Scottish literature."

After moving to London, he studied at Ealing College. On his return to Scotland he studied at Glasgow University, where he wrote a dissertation on Joseph Conrad and the theme of suicide. He then spent some time participating in the Spanish rave scene, before working in Scotland as a train driver's assistant, musician and barman.

Novels and other fiction
Warner's debut novel, the acclaimed Morvern Callar (1995), won a Somerset Maugham Award. It was followed by These Demented Lands (1997), which won the Encore Award. His third novel The Sopranos (1998) won the Saltire Society's Scottish Book of the Year Award.

Since then he has published The Man Who Walks (2002), an imaginative and surreal black comedy; The Worms Can Carry Me to Heaven (2006), which imagines the reminiscences of a sickly Spanish playboy;The Stars in the Bright Sky (2010), a sequel to The Sopranos; The Deadman's Pedal (2012), a coming-of-age novel set in 1973-4; Their Lips Talk of Mischief (2015), a comedy about two aspiring writers in Thatcher's Britain; and Kitchenly 434 (2021), a comedic satire set in the 1970s about a British rock star and the caretaker of his country house retreat. 

His novella 'After the Vision' appeared in the anthology Children of Albion Rovers (1997), and his short story 'Bitter Salvage' was included in Disco Biscuits (1997), an anthology edited by Sarah Champion.

Adaptations of his work
Morvern Callar has been adapted as a film, directed by Lynne Ramsay. The Sopranos has been adapted for the screen by Alan Sharp and Michael Caton-Jones. Released under the title Our Ladies in 2019, it was directed by Caton-Jones.

A play by Lee Hall, Our Ladies of Perpetual Succour, was based on The Sopranos and premiered in 2015, directed by Vicky Featherstone and featuring live songs.

Acclaim and awards
Warner's first three novels all won awards, notably a Somerset Maugham Award. In 2003, he was named by Granta magazine as one of twenty 'Best of Young British Novelists'. In 2010, his novel The Stars in the Bright Sky was included in the longlist for the Man Booker Prize. In 2013, he was awarded the James Tait Black Memorial Prize for his novel The Deadman's Pedal.

Recurring themes and motifs
Alan Warner's novels are mostly set in "The Port", a place bearing some resemblance to Oban. He is known to appreciate 1970s Krautrock band Can; two of his books feature dedications to former band members (Morvern Callar to Holger Czukay and The Man Who Walks to Michael Karoli), and Warner has published a book about their album Tago Mago.

Personal life and teaching career
Warner currently splits his time between Dublin and Javea, Spain, and was the Writer-in-Residence at the University of Edinburgh in 2016.

He was a member of the jury for the 2016 Scotiabank Giller Prize. As of 2019 he is senior lecturer in creative writing at the University of Aberdeen.

Novels 
Morvern Callar (1995)
These Demented Lands (1997)
The Sopranos (1998)
The Man Who Walks (2002)
The Worms Can Carry Me To Heaven (2006)
The Stars in the Bright Sky (2010)
The Deadman's Pedal (2012)
Their Lips Talk of Mischief (2014)
Kitchenly 434 (2021)

Non-fiction 
Tago Mago: Permission to Dream (2015)

Music
Superstar Vs Alan Warner EP, 1998 (a collaboration with Scottish band Superstar)

References

External links 
 Spike Magazine interview
the British Council

1964 births
Living people
People from Connel
Scottish novelists
Fellows of the Royal Society of Literature
People associated with the University of Edinburgh